Ned Sparks (born Edward Arthur Sparkman, November 19, 1883 – April 3, 1957) was a Canadian-born character actor of the American stage and screen. He was known for his deadpan expression and comically nasal, monotone delivery.

Life and career
Sparks was born in Guelph, Ontario, but moved to St. Thomas, Ontario, where he grew up. He left home at 16 and attempted prospecting in the Klondike Gold Rush. After running out of money, he began performing. Billed as a "Singer of Sweet Southern Songs" and costumed in a straw hat, short pants and bare feet, he won a spot as a singer on a traveling musical company's tour. At 19, he returned to Canada and briefly attended a Toronto seminary. He then worked for the railroad and in theater in Toronto. In 1907, he moved to New York City to try his hand in the Broadway theatre, where he appeared in his first show in 1912.

On Broadway, Sparks developed his trademark deadpan expression while portraying a hotel clerk in the play Little Miss Brown. His success caught the attention of Metro-Goldwyn-Mayer studio head Louis B. Mayer, who signed him to a six-picture deal. Sparks appeared in numerous silent films before making his "talkie" debut in The Big Noise (1928). From 1915 to 1947 he appeared in some 90 pictures.

In the 1930s, Sparks became known for portraying dour-faced, sarcastic, cigar-chomping characters. He became so associated with the type that, in 1936, The New York Times reported that Sparks had his face insured for $100,000 with Lloyd's of London. Sparks later admitted the story was a publicity stunt and he was insured for only $10,000. In another stunt, the studio offered a reward of $10,000 to anyone who could capture Sparks smiling in a photograph.

Sparks is particularly known for the wry, comic characters he portrayed in iconic pre-Code Hollywood pictures, such as Blessed Event (1932), 42nd Street (1933), Gold Diggers of 1933 (1933), Lady for a Day (1933), and Sing and Like It (1934).

Sparks was often caricatured in cartoons, including the Jack-in-the-Box character in the Disney short Broken Toys (1935), the jester in Mother Goose Goes Hollywood (1938), a hermit crab in both Tex Avery's Fresh Fish (1939) and Bob Clampett's Goofy Groceries (1941), a chicken in Bob Clampett's Slap Happy Pappy (1940), Friz Freleng's Warner Bros. cartoon Malibu Beach Party (1940), and Tex Avery's Hollywood Steps Out (1941). He also voiced the cartoon characters Heckle and Jeckle from 1947 to 1951.

Sparks appeared in ten Broadway productions and over 80 films. He retired from films in 1947, saying that everyone should retire at 65.

Sparks is a relative of Canadian comedian Ron Sparks.

Death
Sparks died in Victorville, California on April 3, 1957 from the effects of an intestinal blockage.

Complete filmography

References
Notes

Bibliography

External links

 
 
 
 Ned Sparks and Family collection (R16226) at Library and Archives Canada

1883 births
1957 deaths
Canadian male film actors
Canadian male stage actors
Canadian male silent film actors
Canadian people of Swedish descent
Canadian people of English descent
Canadian expatriate male actors in the United States
Vaudeville performers
People from Guelph
Male actors from Ontario
20th-century Canadian male actors